Just One Evil Act is a crime novel by Elizabeth George. It reached first place on the 2013 best sellers list of the New York Times.

External links 
Review on Publishers Weekly.

References 

2013 American novels
American mystery novels
G. P. Putnam's Sons books
Hodder & Stoughton books